Sisk Group is a construction and property company founded in Cork, Ireland in 1859 with operations in Ireland, United Kingdom, Belgium, Poland, Sweden and the Middle East.

History
After an apprenticeship as a plasterer and at the age of 22, John Sisk set up the construction business in 1859.

In April 2019, Sisk was removed from the UK Government's Prompt Payment Code for failing to pay suppliers on time. It was reinstated around 10 months later.

Projects

Major projects involving the company include:
Central Bank of Ireland building, Dublin, completed in 1978
New stand at Croke Park, completed in 1995
Warburton Hall, Lucy Cavendish College, Cambridge, completed in 1995
Aviva Stadium, Dublin, completed in 2010
Grand Canal Theatre, Dublin, completed in 2010
Convention Centre Dublin, completed in 2010
Limerick Tunnel, completed in 2010
International Convention Centre Wales, Newport, completed in 2019
Crossrail Eastern Running Tunnels, due to complete in 2021

References

External links 
 Sisk Group

Companies based in Cork (city)
Companies based in Dublin (city)